The European Society for Philosophy of Medicine and Healthcare (ESPMH) is a philosophy organization in Europe that promotes discussion among philosophers, physicians, ethicists and lawyers about the role of medicine and health care in modern society.

History
It was founded in 1987 in the Netherlands. The ESPMH organizes annually a conference, which is held in a different country every year. The official peer-reviewed journal of the society is Medicine, Health Care and Philosophy.

References

External links 
 ESPMH website

Philosophy organizations